The Inaouen River is a watercourse in Morocco. It is tributary of the Sebou River. The river rises in the Middle Atlas mountain range. A major dam, the Idriss I, was constructed on the Inaouen River in 1973.

Natural history
In the upper parts of the watershed within the Middle Atlas is the prehistoric range of the endangered primate Barbary macaque, which prehistorically had a much larger range in North Africa.

See also
 Baht River
 Ouergha River

Line notes

References
 C. Michael Hogan. 2008. Barbary Macaque: Macaca sylvanus, GlobalTwitcher.com, ed. N. Stromberg
 Thomas Kerlin Park and Aomar Boum. 2003. Historical dictionary of Morocco

Rivers of Morocco